Porfirio Veras Mercedes (born 15 July 1943) is a Dominican Republic sprinter. He competed in the men's 100 metres at the 1968 Summer Olympics.

References

External links
 

1943 births
Living people
Athletes (track and field) at the 1968 Summer Olympics
Dominican Republic male sprinters
Olympic athletes of the Dominican Republic
Place of birth missing (living people)
Central American and Caribbean Games medalists in athletics